The Khanate Mansion and Garden of Amin Islami (or simply referred to as: Khanate Mansion of Amin Islami, or Mansion of Amin Islami; Persian: عمارت و باغ امین اسلامی) is one of the historical buildings and gardens of the city of Nishapur. The building was built in the Pahlavi era of Iran. This building is part of the Iranian national heritage list with the registration number of 4809.

This mansion has been the personal home of one of the khans of Nishapur, named Amin Islami, in the Pahlavi era. This mansion along with its garden are now used as a public space. This mansion is located within one of the busiest areas of the city and is close to the downtown of Nishapur. Another historical garden/park is located in front of the southern section of this garden which with the name of Baghmeli of Nishapur (Persian:باغ ملی نیشابور) or literally "The national garden of Nishapur".

This mansion/garden along with the Baghmeli of Nishapur is situated next to a hospital and several commercial centers, restaurants, cafes and two hotels.

Gallery

References 

Infobox mapframe without OSM relation ID on Wikidata
Nishapur